KBW may refer to:

 KBW, the National Rail station code for Knebworth railway station, North Hertfordshire, England
Korpus Bezpieczeństwa Wewnętrznego or Internal Security Corps, a Polish military organization
Kommunistischer Bund Westdeutschland, the Communist League of West Germany
Keefe, Bruyette & Woods, an investment bank 
Kevin Bloody Wilson, Australian comedy musician